KMUD (91.1 FM) is a community radio station broadcasting a variety format. Licensed to Garberville, California, the station serves Humboldt, Northern Mendocino, and western Trinity counties in the North Coast region. KMUD is owned by Redwood Community Radio and its studios are located in Redway, California.

KMUD simulcasts its programming on two full power FM stations: KMUE 88.1 in Eureka and KLAI 90.3 in Laytonville. It also maintains a translator at 99.5 FM in Shelter Cove, California.

KMUD is a member of the Grassroots Radio Coalition and hosted the organization's annual conference in 2010.

KMUD plays live local festivals such as Reggae on the River and Summer Arts & Music Festival. The recording is saved on the stations archives.

History 
KMUD went on the air on May 28, 1987. For decades the station has issued warnings and alerts to the region on the whereabouts of law enforcement on their way to raid marijuana gardens.

See also
Community radio
Pacifica Radio
List of community radio stations in the United States

References

External links

MUD
Community radio stations in the United States
Cannabis in California